Mobiles for development (M4D), a more specific iteration of Information and Communication Technologies for Development (ICT4D), refers to the use of mobile technologies in global development strategies. Focusing on the fields of international and socioeconomic development and human rights, M4D relies on the theory that increased access to mobile devices acts as an integral cornerstone in the promotion of overall societal development.

Once viewed as an item of luxury and privilege, mobile phones and devices have become a near necessity throughout the developed and developing world alike. According to a 2007 United Nations study, over two thirds of the world's mobile phones are owned and utilized within developing countries. With less-developed wired infrastructure and the high cost associated with its modernization and implementation, the adoption of cellular technologies can be attributed to a necessary leapfrogging of traditional telephony and communication technologies. In addition, the unsound and undependable electrical infrastructure of many developing countries does not cater well to mass hardwired ICT adoption. The portability, battery power, and flexibility of mobile technologies is well suited to the common pursuits and lifestyles of those residing in the developing world.

This mass adoption of ICTs and mobile phones as well the increased quality and expanse of signal coverage within many developing countries has led to increased academic, socioeconomic, and political attention as the various impacts of the M4D movement continue to expand. In addition to the predictable developmental outcomes of mobile adoption including increased economic agency, unforeseen progress has been experienced in the forms of individual empowerment, female agency, as well as familial and community growth.

The opportunities for effective mass mobilization and aggregation of information and data offered by developmental movements utilizing cellular telephones and other mobile devices such as tablets have been widely featured in the mass media and academia. Literature on this matter is being steadily produced as developing countries continue to adopt mobile technologies at a remarkable rate.

Mobile accessibility and use 

Recent developments in mobile communication and computation technologies have led to the expansion of mobile phone, smartphone, tablet computer, and netbook ownership. Typically marketed to the developed world as supplementary to standard laptops and desktop computers, these electronic products often offer lower price points to the consumer. This lower price point caters well to developing countries and their rapidly evolving markets for ICT expansion and adoption. These mobile devices come equipped with basic mobile communications hard and software such as WiFi and 3G services which allow users to connect to the Internet via mobile and wireless networks without having to secure a landline or an expensive broadband connection via DSL, cable Internet or fiber optics. This leapfrogging movement towards the acceptance and implementation of mobile technologies made the Internet and modern digital telecommunications more accessible to people, particularly those in emerging markets and developing countries.

According to International Telecommunication Union, mobile ICTs have emerged as the primary form of technology that will offer a bridge within the digital divide. Data collected by the ITU shows the trajectory of mobile technologies as their adoption out-paces and even replaces the adoption of desktop computers and standard laptops.

The International Telecommunication Union estimates that as of 2013, approximately 6.8 billion mobile-cellular subscriptions are held worldwide, 5.2 billion of which are held in developing countries. These numbers stand in stark contrast to the penetration rate of fixed-telephone subscriptions which stand at approximately 1.2 billion worldwide, a small margin over half of which belong to the developing world.

The following table displays key ICT indicators for developed and developing countries as well as world totals from 2010 to 2013:

The trends displayed in the table above are further supported by the successful sales reports of technology companies selling mobile technologies in emerging markets within developing countries. Some multinational computer manufacturers like Acer and Lenovo are marketing more affordable netbooks to emerging markets such as those in China, Indonesia and India.

Mobile leapfrogging 

Originally a concept used in reference to economic growth theories and industrialization, leapfrogging has more recently been used in the context of sustainable development for developing countries within world development theories. Technological leapfrogging refers to the acceleration of development through the skipping of low-grade, less efficient, and more costly technologies and industries in favour of the direct adoption of more effective and advanced technologies.

In the case of M4D, the trajectory of the rapid mass adoption of mobile technologies can be attributed to the "mobile leapfrog effect", whereby many developing countries have been seen to bypass traditional routes of wired telephony and broadband infrastructure and development, opting instead for the immediate appropriation of wireless cellular and broadband technology. This mobile leapfrogging can be attributed to the lengthy process and high cost of wired infrastructure implementation. Additionally, as seen in mobile adoption in the Arab States, wired infrastructure that predates mobile technology is often old, outdated, and incapable of data transmission, "the basic requirement for implementing Digital Subscriber Line (DSL) services".

Mobile ICT platforms and their wide adoption in developing countries serves as an ideal example of leapfrog technology and current practices of leapfrogging within the sustainable development of developing countries. By enabling developing countries to “leapfrog” over legacy technologies of the wired telephone and Internet service of the 20th century and embrace the mobile technologies of the 21st century, opportunities to bridge the Digital divide have been argued to become more prevalent.

Mobile hacking 

The term ‘mobile hack’ refers to the use-based practices of mobile technology that goes beyond the use intended by the creators of the device. Often used in order to circumvent the high cost of mobile ownership and use, mobile hacks have become common practice in many developing countries. Mobile hacks have also proven to be widespread in the adoption of mobile technologies in developing countries. Device sharing, the ‘Missed Call’ technique, and the transferring of mobile credits has allowed for individuals who were previously isolated from digital communication the opportunity to economically engage in the networked community.

Device sharing, most commonly the sharing of mobile telephones, refers to the practice of sharing a mobile device between a number of individuals either within a family or a community.

The 'Missed call' technique refers to the establishment of a code that works around connection charges by utilizing a specified number of rings prior to cutting a call. This method avoids call charge and uses discreet codes to convey messages. This technique goes against the profit models of mobile service providers and allows for individuals to communicate messages in a cost-effective manner.

Through the transfer of mobile credits, mobile device owners are able to use credits of an amount specified by their service provider as a means of monetary transaction. By sending credits to another's mobile device, an exchange of cash can be made in situations that it is necessitated.

Social impacts 

According to the ITU's report "Measuring the Information Society," mobile phones and other mobile ICT devices are seen to be replacing standard laptops and desktop computers as the main platform for Internet and ICT access and use. This increased access to and use of mobile phones offers individuals a handheld communication platform that can assist in expanding the level of citizen agency in the development of local and international social, economic, and political endeavours. It also offers individuals the opportunity to form social, economic, and political communities, regardless of geographic location, and provides an at-hand device that allows individuals to fight against human rights abuses from the ground. Organizations such as Digital Democracy (Dd) and the Democratic Voice of Burma offer users the ability to report, compile, and disseminate news and information about human rights violations in order to effectuate global attention and action.

In the establishment and fostering of mobile citizens within developing countries, a "bottom of the pyramid" corporate approach has been encouraged in order to "convert poverty into a business opportunity that benefits everyone."

Case studies

Africa 

 Nigeria: Statistics regarding mobile phone adoption and coverage in Nigeria estimate that new subscribers are signing up for mobile phone services at a rate of approximately 1/second with approximately 90% of sub-Saharan Africa equipped with mobile service coverage. In correlation with this mass adoption and widespread geographic coverage, the ITU estimates that 77% of individuals in Nigeria over the age of 15 who own a mobile device use mobile technologies such as their personal mobile phones to access the Internet. In comparison to the 13% who access the Internet through traditional laptops and desktop computers, the importance and potential impact of mobile telephony, information, and communications technologies is perceptible.
 South Africa: According to a 2012 UNAIDS study, approximately 18% of the population of South Africa between the ages of 15 and 49 are infected with HIV/AIDS. This high prevalence rate along with South Africa's weak state health infrastructure and disparate system of rural clinics has promoted a difficult environment in which to monitor and ensure effective treatment of the disease. The introduction of mobile technology has allowed for home-based care, medical advice, and counseling for HIV/AIDS patients. Programs such as Cell-Life’s “Aftercare” have introduced the use of mobile telephones for the documentation and reporting of a patient's medical status and drug dosage adherence. The information that is produced is stored in a database in order to facilitate future care options and to inform on the severity and prevalence of the South African AIDS epidemic according to region. Concerning the patient, “Aftercare” aims to diminish the risk of a patient contracting high levels of toxicity in their system due to inaccurate dosage of anti-retroviral treatment drugs.

M4D in health 

According to a report by InfoDev, “[h]ealth conditions in rural areas are generally poorer, and access to information, services, and supplies is most limited.” With the rapid worldwide adoption of mobile technology, a range of health-related areas such as the improvement of public health information dissemination, the facilitation of remote consultation, diagnosis, and treatment, the sharing of a patient's health information between health professional, and the monitoring and increased efficiency of public health systems have adopted and benefited from mobile based practices.

Studies have suggested that the use of mobile capabilities such as text message reminders regarding dosage information and the increased communication between health professionals has allowed for increased effectiveness in treatment and control of disease. Cases of mobile technology being effectively piloted and utilized in the area of public health exhibits the promise of M4D programs and practices in the spheres of health prevention and medical care for the world's developing nations.

The following lists a sampling of programs utilizing M4D strategies for the improvement of public health in developing countries around the world:

 Academy for Educational Development's Satellife program – A non-profit program exploring the increased potential of a health workers’ ability to diagnose and treat illnesses due to the information that can be delivered over mobile networks of health professionals.
 Cell-Life is an NGO engaging in development programs that promote and assist in the collection of medical data on mobile devices in order to better disseminate information and promote better patient and public health management. In conjunction with Columbia University's International Center for AIDS Care and Treatment Programs, Cell-Life is working on the development of mobile technology based behaviour change communications (BCC) that aims to address the increasing incidence of HIV as well as morbidity and mortality rates amongst the South African homosexual population. Their campaigns 'HealthSmart' and 'Just-Tested' aim to promote safer sexual practices and provide information pertaining to HIV prevention and care through the use of SMS. The World Health Organization has also partnered with Cell-Life in order to evaluate the use of mobile phones in reference to medical abortion in Cape Town, South Africa. The m-assist project "aimed to assess whether the combination of information, self-assessment and support provided via mobile phones would reduce the need for follow-up visits by clients; enhance the experience of MA; reduce demands on MA providers; and increase post-abortion knowledge and uptake of contraception." Through the use of SMS, women were coached through the process of MA, asked to self-assess their completion of MA, and were offered family planning information. Cell-Life also runs programs without external partnerships. Cell-Life's program Red aims to offer South African youth easy access to HIV/AIDS related information in order to improve levels of knowledge pertaining to prevention. Red also aims through the use of mobile platforms to create a private, affordable, and easily accessible space in which those suffering from or affected by HIV/AIDS.

Affiliated programs 

The ability to mobilize data aggregation to the mobile-carrying public offers NGOs a valuable resource for their efforts for social, political, economic, and environmental justice. According to a study published by the Vodafone Group Foundation and the UN Foundation Partnership, of a sample of over 500 NGOs, “eighty-six per cent used mobiles, with 99 per cent characterizing its utility positively, with one-quarter of those citing it as a ‘revolutionary’ technology and another one-third calling it indispensable for their work.”. The benefits perceived by M4D initiatives include their "ability to mobilize and aggregate information and data more effectively and to a wider audience" as well as their time-saving qualities in the fields of social justice, environmental conservation, global health and humanitarian assistance.

The following lists organizations engaging in M4D strategies and programming:

 GSMA Mobile for Development
 United Nations ICT Task Force
 FrontlineSMS
 Fahamu
 Solidarity for African Women's Rights (SOAWR)
 UNAIDS
 TechChange

Criticisms and challenges 

The potential for the expansion and replication of M4D projects has been recognized as vital to the overall success of this development practice. The sharing and exchange of information and technical advancements can allow for easier and less costly adoption in other developing countries however, many of the organizations creating and implementing M4D projects act within 'innovation silos'. This siloing of information threatens to create and solidify boundaries between organizations and mobile development projects.

The environmental implications of increased mobile usage can be seen in the form of the large electronic waste dumps found in many of the developing countries meant to benefit from M4D programs and policies.

In addition, it has been argued that the introduction of mobile information and communication technologies could result in the proliferation of the Matthew effect, whereby the "rich get richer." In the case of mobile adoption, the inequalities of wealth considered encompass both economic and knowledge-based wealth. Despite the benefits attributed to the adoption and use of mobile ICTs for development purposes, the information and communication resources in question have been initially created and adopted within already developed countries.

Even though eventually almost everyone might benefit from a resource such as the Internet, those with the most resources (status, cognition, education, income, access) adopt first, have and gain more skills, and use more and different activities more effectively. They thus obtain earlier and more benefits, thereby increasing, rather than reducing, knowledge gaps in society.

Also problematic is the potential for mobile hardware and software development in developing countries to become a purely for-profit endeavour. As stated by a UN Foundation-Vodafone Group Foundation Partnership publication, "the potential for scaling up 'mobile for good' initiatives may come with identifying commercial incentives." The free and open source software applications that have been developed and implemented by various NGOs in developing countries as well as the ad-hoc communal use of mobile devices could be threatened by the prospective monetization of the mass markets available in the developing world.

See also 
 Mobile device
 Global digital divide
 International Telecommunication Union

References 

Mobile technology